Maumee Ice Piedmont is an ice piedmont at the terminus of Kohler Glacier, east of the Jenkins Heights, on the Walgreen Coast of Marie Byrd Land, Antarctica. Upon construction of fuel storage tanks at McMurdo Station, completed in 1970, the Maumee replaced smaller tankers used earlier, delivering in one voyage a year's supply of petroleum fuels.

References

Ice piedmonts of Antarctica
Bodies of ice of Marie Byrd Land